Evan Gulbis (born 26 March 1986) is an Australian cricketer who most recently played for the Victorian cricket team in Australian domestic cricket competitions. Originally from Williamstown, Gulbis plays for Carlton in Victorian Premier Cricket. Gulbis made his debut for Victoria in a Twenty20 match against New South Wales at the Melbourne Cricket Ground on 22 January 2011.

He played as an overseas professional for Macclesfield CC in the ECB Cheshire Premier League in 2006 and 2007.

After playing a number of limited overs and T20 games for Victoria in the 2010–11 session, Gulbis was picked up for a regular position in the Tasmanian side, making his first class debut for Tasmania against his former home state in November 2011. After that, he spent several years in the Tasmanian side filling the all rounder position in the team and on 13 March 2014, Gulbis made 229 playing for Tasmania against South Australia. This is the second highest first class score for a number 8 batsman. Despite some success, Tasmania eventually cut Gulbis from their line up for the 2016–17 season, and he was later brought into the Victorian team for the Matador Cup limited overs competition.

In the 2016–17 season, Gulbis was signed to the Wellington side in New Zealand's domestic T20 tournament.

References

External links
 

1986 births
Living people
Cricketers from Melbourne
Australian cricketers
Victoria cricketers
People from Williamstown, Victoria
Tasmania cricketers
Wellington cricketers
Hobart Hurricanes cricketers
Melbourne Stars cricketers